The Forlani Cabinet, led by Arnaldo Forlani, was the 38th cabinet of the Italian Republic.

The government was composed of DC, PSI, PSDI and PRI, with the abstention of the PLI. Since in the Italian Senate the abstention is valid as a contrary vote, the two senators of the PLI did not take part in the vote of confidence to the government.

He fell as a result of the P2 lodge scandal. Forlani resigned on 26 May 1981.

Party breakdown

Ministers and other members
 Christian Democracy (DC): Prime minister, 13 ministers and 28 undersecretaries
 Italian Socialist Party (PSI): 7 ministers and 17 undersecretaries
 Italian Democratic Socialist Party (PSDI): 3 ministers and 5 undersecretaries
 Italian Republican Party (PRI): 3 ministers and 4 undersecretaries

Composition

Italian governments
Cabinets established in 1980
Cabinets disestablished in 1981
1980 establishments in Italy
1981 disestablishments in Italy